Leonhard of Gorizia (1440 – 12 April 1500) was the last Count of Görz from the Meinhardiner dynasty, who ruled at Lienz and Gorizia (Görz) from 1454 until his death.

Family
Leonhard was born at Bruck Castle in Lienz, the comital residence of the House of Gorizia. He was the son of Henry VI, Count of Gorizia, and his wife, Catherine, a daughter of the Hungarian palatine Nicholas II Garay. In 1454 he succeeded his father, who left him an almost ruined county with two separate territories.

Leonhard married, in 1478, Paola Gonzaga, the daughter of the Italian marquis Ludovico III of Mantua, but the union proved childless, as was his first marriage to Hieronyma of Ilok, the daughter of Nicholas of Ilok, King of Bosnia.

During the negotiations for his marriage, Andrea da Schivenoglia, chronicler of the Gonzaga family, described the then 36-old Count of Gorizia as "pleasant and joyful" (piaxevolo et zoioso).

Early reign 
Leonhard at first ruled jointly with his brothers John II and Louis. John as the eldest apparently held most of the power while younger Louis did not exercise any political role and died between 1456 and 1457. The brothers had to face the hostility of Emperor Frederick III who aimed to seize their remaining "outer county" around the town of Lienz and the Puster Valley, separating the Habsburg hereditary lands of Tyrol and Carinthia, which had been possessions of the Meinhardiner dynasty until the 14th century.

Moreover, John and Leonhard picked a fierce inheritance conflict around the lands of the extinct counts of Celje after the death of Count Ulrich II in 1456, whereupon the defeated brothers not only had to renounce all their claims but also were forced to cede the residence at Lienz and various territories in Carinthia to Frederick III. The Counts of Görz had to move to Heinfels Castle. John died in 1462 and Leonhard became sole ruler. With the help of his capable deputy Virgil von Graben, a relative from the House of Graben von Stein, he recovered Lienz.

Succession 
Facing the extinction of the dynasty, sickly Count Leonhard became subject to the competing pressures of both the Imperial Habsburg dynasty and the Republic of Venice, which both competed for his heritage. The Venice Ten, who since 1434 ruled over the Domini di Terraferma in Friuli, intended to seize the adjacent "inner county" centered on the town of Gorizia itself. In the end Leonhard leaned towards the Habsburgs and signed an inheritance treaty with Frederick's son Emperor Maximilian I.

Upon his death, Austrian troops immediately occupied the town of Gorizia. The Habsburgs (re-)united Lienz with the County of Tyrol and went on to rule as Counts in Gorizia (Gorizia and Gradisca from 1754). Leonhard's former deputy Virgil von Graben, who had played a vital role in the convergence to the Habsburg dynasty, took the position as a Stadtholder in Lienz from them.

References

1440 births
1500 deaths
Counts of Gorizia
People from Lienz